Sophia Takal is an American actress, writer and director, perhaps best known for her work in independent features such as All the Light in the Sky, Supporting Characters and Gabi on the Roof in July. Filmmaker magazine named Takal one of the "25 New Faces of Film" in 2011. She directed and co-wrote the 2019 remake of the 1974 horror film Black Christmas.

Early life
Takal is from Montclair, New Jersey.

Career
Takal has worked on and starred in numerous independent films, some associated with the mumblecore movement.

In March 2011, Takal's first directorial effort, Green, was premiered at the South by Southwest Festival and was positively received, winning Takal the festival's Chicken and Egg Emergent Narrative Woman Director prize. She also wrote the film. In 2015, Takal directed another feature-length film, Always Shine. The film stars Mackenzie Davis, Caitlin FitzGerald, and her husband Lawrence Michael Levine.

Takal and her husband operate a production company called Little Teeth Pictures.

Personal life

Takal is married to the filmmaker Lawrence Michael Levine, a frequent collaborator and co-star. She studied film at Vassar before graduating from Barnard College.

Filmography

Actress

Director

References

External links

American film actresses
American women film directors
Barnard College alumni
21st-century American actresses
Living people
People from Montclair, New Jersey
Vassar College alumni
Film directors from New Jersey
1986 births